The 1800 United States presidential election in New York took place between October 31 and December 3, 1800, as part of the 1800 United States presidential election. The state legislature chose 12 representatives, or electors to the Electoral College, who voted for President and Vice President.

During this election, New York cast 12 electoral votes for Democratic-Republican Party candidate Thomas Jefferson.

See also
 United States presidential elections in New York

References

New York
1800
1800 New York (state) elections